Stadiums Limited is an Australian company established in the late 1890s that owned and administered four venues on Australia's east coast at West Melbourne Stadium, Sydney Stadium, Leichhardt Stadium and Brisbane Festival Hall. It was founded in 1915 by John Wren and Dick Lean Senior who acted as the general manager. Incorporated in its final form in 1915, prior to this, Wren worked with Lean Senior, purchasing the various locations, including the site of what became the West Melbourne Hall, and ultimately Festival Hall from Reginald (Snowy) Baker. Stadiums initially began presenting both boxing and professional wrestling. Wren, as he did in other parts of his life, offered a great deal of money to boxers and wrestlers to perform. The operations of Stadiums Ltd changed in the second half of the 20th century, as the venues began to be predominantly used for live music and for television broadcasts. Notably, it was Dick Lean Junior as the promoter and Managing Director of Stadiums Ltd who booked the Beatles to play Australia in 1964 - arguably the most successful Concert coup in Australian entertainment history. Dick Lean became Managing Director of Stadiums, vastly increasing the Company profitability by continuing to promote and bring to Australia many of the major headline acts during the 1960s, 1970s and 1980s - all who performed in the Stadium's venues in Melbourne, Sydney and Brisbane.

The Wren family and others still own Stadiums Ltd as of 2017, and it remains one of Australia oldest private companies.
  
Post an extended period of losses over many years and the sale of the company's last operational asset, Festival Hall - Melbourne, in December 2020 - Stadiums Pty Ltd entered voluntary liquidation and was formally wound up in July 2021.

Notable wrestlers

Jim Browning
Primo Carnera 
Vic Christy
Dean Detton 
Gorgeous George 
Dr. Jerry Graham 
Roy Heffernan 
Ski Hi Lee 
Ed "Strangler" Lewis 
Jim Londos 
Earl McCready 
Danny McShain 
Billy Meeske
John Pesek 
Ad Santel 
Gus Sonnenberg 
Joe Stecher 
Ray Steele 
Sandor Szabo 
Lou Thesz 
Ted Thye

See also

Boxing in Australia
Professional wrestling in Australia

References

External links

Entertainment companies established in 1915
Australian companies established in 1915
Boxing in Australia
Professional wrestling in Australia
Real estate companies established in 1915
Privately held companies of Australia